The 1985 Campeonato Nacional was Chilean football league top tier's 53rd season. Cobreloa was the tournament's champion, winning its third title.

League table

Results

Topscorer

Liguilla Pre-Copa Libertadores

Pre-Copa Libertadores play-off
Played between 1985 League champions and 1984 League runners-up.

Cobresal qualified for the 1986 Copa Libertadores

See also
1985 Copa Polla Gol

References

External links 
ANFP 
RSSSF Chile 1985

Primera División de Chile seasons
Chile
Primera